Schertzer is a surname. Notable people with the surname include:

Hymie Shertzer (also spelled Schertzer; 1909–1977), American jazz saxophonist
Mike Schertzer (born 1965), Canadian artist and poet
Robert M. Schertzer (born 1962), Canadian ophthalmologist

See also
Scherzer
Shertzer